These 379 genera belong to the family Leiodidae, round fungus beetles. There are about 3,800 described species in Leiodidae.

Leiodidae genera

 Subfamily Camiarinae Jeannel, 1911
 Tribe Agyrtodini Jeannel, 1936
 Afropelates Jeannel, 1964
 Agyrtodes Portevin, 1907
 Agyrtolasia Szymczakowski, 1973
 Chelagyrtodes Szymczakowski, 1973
 Chiliopelates Jeannel, 1964
 Cholevomorpha Blackburn, 1891
 Dasypelates Portevin, 1907
 Dictydiella Jeannel, 1936
 Dontipelates Salgado Costas, 2015
 Eupelates Portevin, 1907
 Karinapelates Salgado Costas, 2015
 Paragyrtodes Szymczakowski, 1966
 Ragytodina Jeannel, 1957
 Zeagyrtes Broun, 1917
 Zeagyrtoma Szymczakowski, 1966
 Zearagytodes Jeannel, 1936
 †Cretagyrtodes Cai & Huang, 2017
 Tribe Camiarini Jeannel, 1911
 Baeosilpha Broun, 1895
 Camiarites Jeannel, 1957
 Camiarodes Seago, 2015
 Camiarus Sharp, 1878
 Camisolus Seago, 2015
 Inocatops Broun, 1893
 Neocamiarus Jeannel, 1957
 Zenocolon Broun, 1917
 Tribe Neopelatopini Jeannel, 1962
 Alsobius
 Capnosolius Seago & Newton, 2009
 Catopsolius Sharp, 1886
 Eublackburniella Jeannel, 1938
 Myrmicholeva Lea, 1910
 Neopelatops Jeannel, 1936
 Ragytodes Jeannel, 1936
 Sphaeropelatops Jeannel, 1962
 Subfamily Catopocerinae Hatch, 1927
 Catopocerus Motschulsky, 1870
 Glacicavicola Westcott, 1968
 Muganryus
 Perkovskius Lafer, 1989
 Pinodytes Horn, 1880
 Subfamily Cholevinae Kirby, 1837
 Tribe Anemadini Hatch, 1928
 Subtribe Anemadina
 Anemadiola Szymczakowski, 1963
 Anemadus Reitter, 1884
 Cholevodes Portevin, 1928
 Speonemadus Jeannel, 1922
 Subtribe Eocatopina
 Eocatops Peyerimhoff, 1924
 Neoeocatops Peck & Cook, 2007
 Subtribe Eunemadina
 Araucaniopsis Salgado Costas, 2005
 Austrocholeva Zwick, 1979
 Austronargus Zwick, 1979
 Austronemadus Zwick, 1979
 Catoposchema Jeannel, 1936
 Dissochaetus Reitter, 1884
 Eunemadus Portevin, 1914
 Falkocholeva Hatch, 1928
 Falkonemadus Szymczakowski, 1961
 Nargiotes Jeannel, 1936
 Nargomorphus Jeannel, 1936
 Nemadiolus Jeannel, 1936
 Nemadiopsis Jeannel, 1936
 Nemadotropis Szymczakowski, 1971
 Newtoniopsis Salgado Costas, 2005
 Paranemadus Zwick, 1979
 Peckardia Salgado Costas, 2005
 Pseudonargiotes Salgado Costas, 2005
 Pseudonemadus Portevin, 1914
 Rangiola Jeannel, 1936
 Subtribe Nemadina
 Micronemadus Jeannel, 1936
 Nemadus Thomson, 1867
 Subtribe Paracatopina
 Mesocolon Broun, 1880
 Paracatops Portevin, 1907
 Tribe Cholevini Kirby, 1837
 Subtribe Catopina (Jeannel 1922)
 Apocatops Zwick, 1968
 Apterocatops Miyama, 1985
 Catopidius Jeannel, 1922
 Catopodes Portevin, 1914
 Catops Paykull, 1798
 Catoptrichus Murray, 1856
 Chionocatops Ganglbauer, 1899
 Cholevinus Reitter, 1901
 Dreposcia Jeannel, 1922
 Dzungarites Jeannel, 1936
 Fissocatops Zwick, 1968
 Himalops Perreau, 1986
 Mesocatops Szymczakowski, 1961
 Rybinskiella Reitter, 1906
 Sciodrepoides Hatch, 1933
 Subtribe Cholevina Kirby 1837
 Attaephilus Motschoulsky, 1870
 Attumbra Gozis, 1886
 Catopsimorphus Aubé, 1850
 Choleva Latreille, 1796
 Nargus Thomson, 1867
 Philomessor Jeannel, 1936
 Prionochaeta Horn, 1880
 Takobiella Ruzicka, 1992
 Tribe Eucatopini
 Eucatops Portevin, 1903
 Tribe Leptodirini
 Subtribe Anthroherponina
 Anthroherpon Reitter, 1889
 Croatodirus Casale, Giachino & Jalzic, 2000
 Hadesia Muller, 1911
 Kircheria Giachino & Vailati, 2006
 Leptomeson Jeannel, 1924
 Nauticiella Moravec & Mlejnek, 2002
 Parantrophilon Noesske, 1914
 Velebitodromus Casale, Giachino & Jalžic, 2004
 Subtribe Bathysciina
 Anillocharis Reitter, 1903
 Anisoscapha Muller, 1917
 Antrodulus Knirsch, 1927
 Aphaobiella Gueorguiev, 1976
 Aphaobius Abeille de Perrin, 1878
 Augustia Zariquiey, 1927
 Bathyscia Schiödte, 1848
 Blattochaeta Reitter, 1910
 Blattodromus Reitter, 1904
 Cansiliella Paoletti, 1972
 Deelemaniella Perreau, 2002
 Epiroella
 Henrotiella Perreau, 1999
 Hexaurus Reitter, 1884
 Huetheriella Jeannel, 1934
 Leonhardella Reitter, 1903
 Lessiniella Pavan, 1941
 Lotharia Mandl, 1944
 Netolitzkya Muller, 1913
 Orostygia Muller, 1912
 Oryotus Miller, 1856
 Phaneropella Jeannel, 1910
 Pholeuodromus Breit, 1913
 Pholeuonopsis Apfelbeck, 1901
 Pisidiella Jeannel, 1930
 Pretneria Muller, 1931
 Proleonhardella Jeannel, 1910
 Prospelaeobates Giachino & Etonti, 1996
 Serboleonhardella
 Sinobathyscia Perreau, 1999
 Speophyes Jeannel, 1910
 Tartariella Nonveiller & Pavicevic, 1999
 Weiratheria Zariquiey, 1927
 Subtribe Bathysciotina
 Aphaotus Breit, 1914
 Bathyscidius Jeannel, 1910
 Bathysciotes Jeannel, 1910
 Halbherria Conci & Tamanini, 1951
 Neobathyscia Muller, 1917
 Pavicevicia Perreau, 2008
 Pseudobathyscidius Karaman, 1964
 Ravasinia Muller, 1922
 Redensekia Karaman, 1953
 Sinuicollia Piva, 2008
 Speonesiotes Jeannel, 1910
 Sphaerobathyscia Muller, 1917
 Subtribe Leptodirina
 Adelopidius Apfelbeck, 1907
 Albanodirus Giachino & Vailati, 1998
 Antrosedes Reitter, 1912
 Apholeuonus Reitter, 1889
 Astagobius Reitter, 1886
 Balcanobius Gueorguiev, 1965
 Bathyscimorphus Jeannel, 1910
 Bathysciopsis Muller, 1941
 Beroniella Giachino & Gueorguiev, 1991
 Bulgariella Karaman, 1958
 Ceuthmonocharis Jeannel, 1910
 Charonites Apfelbeck, 1907
 Elladoherpon Casale, 1983
 Genestiellina Giachino, 1996
 Haplotropidius Muller, 1903
 Icharonia Reitter, 1912
 Katobatizon Knirsch, 1928
 Laneyriella Gueorguiev, 1976
 Leonhardia Reitter, 1901
 Leptodirus Schmidt, 1832
 Leptostagus Karaman, 1954
 Nonveilleriella Perreau & Pavicevic, 2008
 Parapropus Ganglbauer, 1899
 Petkovskiella Gueorguiev, 1976
 Pholeuonella Jeannel, 1910
 Pholeuonidius Jeannel, 1911
 Protobracharthron Reitter, 1889
 Radziella Casale & Jalzic, 1988
 Remyella Jeannel, 1931
 Rhaetiella Giachino & Vailati, 2005
 Roubaliella Jeannel, 1925
 Rozajella Curcic, Brajkovic & Curcic, 2007
 Setnikia Breit, 1913
 Spelaeodromus Reitter, 1884
 Spelaites Apfelbeck, 1907
 Speoplanes Muller, 1911
 Subtribe Pholeuina
 Adelopsella Jeannel, 1908
 Albaniola Jeannel, 1924
 Anillochlamys Jeannel, 1909
 Antrocharis Abeille de Perrin, 1878
 Aranzadiella Espaol, 1972
 Archeoboldoria Ghidini, 1937
 Atticiella Coiffait, 1955
 Babuniella Karaman, 1954
 Banatiola Decu, 1967
 Baronniesia Fresneda, Bourdeau & Faille, 2009
 Bathysciella Jeannel, 1906
 Bathysciola Jeannel, 1910
 Bellesia Fresneda & Hernando, 1994
 Beronia Gueorguiev, 1960
 Beskovia Gueorguiev, 1960
 Besuchetiola Rampini & Zoia, 1991
 Bithyniella Jeannel, 1955
 Boldoria Jeannel, 1924
 Breuilia Jeannel, 1909
 Breuilites Salgado, 1980
 Bureschiana Gueorguiev, 1963
 Cacciamalia
 Canavesiella Giachino, 1993
 Cantabrogeus Salgado, 2000
 Capraiola Zoia & Rampini, 1994
 Cavazzutiella Casale & Giachino, 1985
 Ceretophyes Comas & Escola, 1989
 Ceuthophyes Jeannel, 1924
 Closania Jeannel, 1928
 Coiffaitiola Jeannel, 1955
 Coreobathyscia Szymczakowski, 1975
 Cryptobathyscia Vailati, 1980
 Cytodromus Abeille de Perrin, 1876
 Dalmatiola Jeannel, 1924
 Dellabeffaella Capra, 1924
 Diaprysius Abeille de Perrin, 1878
 Drimeotus Miller, 1856
 Espanoliella Gueorguiev, 1976
 Euryspeonomus Jeannel, 1919
 Fresnedaella
 Frivaldszkya
 Fusi Perkovsky, 1989
 Gesciella Giachino & Guéorguiev, 1989
 Ghidinia
 Gueorguievella Giachino & Gueorguiev, 2006
 Hartigiella
 Hoffmannella Muller, 1912
 Hussonella Jeannel, 1934
 Insubriella Vailati, 1990
 Iranobathyscia Zoia & Rampini, 1994
 Isereus Reitter, 1886
 Josettekia Belles & Deliot, 1983
 Karadeniziella Casale & Giachino, 1989
 Lagariella Fresneda, 2000
 Leonesiella Salgado, 1996
 Magdelainella Jeannel, 1924
 Maroniella Casale & Giachino, 1985
 Miettiella
 Monguzziella Vailati, 1993
 Muelleriella Jeannel, 1924
 Nafarroa Fresneda & Dupré, 2010
 Naspunius Fresneda, Hernando & Lagar, 1994
 Notidocharis Jeannel, 1956
 Ochridiola Sbordoni, 1971
 Oresigenus Jeannel, 1948
 Ovobathysciola Jeannel, 1924
 Pallaresiella Fresneda, 1998
 Pangaeoniola G. & M.Etonti, 1985
 Parabathyscia Jeannel, 1908
 Paranillochlamys Zariquiey, 1940
 Paraspeonomus Coiffait, 1952
 Paratroglophyes Fourès, 1954
 Parvospeonomus Bellés & Escolà, 1977
 Patriziella Jeannel, 1956
 Pavaniola
 Perriniella Jeannel, 1910
 Phacomorphus Jeannel, 1908
 Pholeuon Hampe, 1856
 Proleptodirina Perkovsky, 1997
 Protopholeuon Jeannel, 1923
 Pseudoboldoria Ghidini, 1937
 Pseudospeonomus Comas, Fresneda & Salgado, 2007
 Purkynella Knirsch, 1926
 Quaestus Schaufuss, 1861
 Radevia Knirsch, 1925
 Ragazzonia
 Rhodopiola Gueorguiev, 1960
 Royerella Jeannel, 1910
 Salgadoia Fresneda, 1998
 Sbordoniola Zoia & Rampini, 1994
 Sengletiola Zoia & Rampini, 1994
 Sophrochaeta Reitter, 1884
 Spelaeochlamys Dieck, 1871
 Speocharidius Jeannel, 1919
 Speocharinus Espaol & Escola, 1977
 Speodiaetus Jeannel, 1908
 Speonomidius Jeannel, 1924
 Speonomites Jeannel, 1910
 Speonomus Jeannel, 1908
 Stoppaniola
 Stygiophyes Fresneda, 1998
 Tismanella Jeannel, 1928
 Trapezodirus Jeannel, 1924
 Trocharanis Reitter, 1884
 Troglocharinus Reitter, 1908
 Troglodromus Sainte-Claire Deville, 1901
 Troglophyes Abeille de Perrin, 1894
 Viallia Pavan, 1950
 Zariquieyella Jeannel, 1928
 Subtribe Platycholeina
 Platycholeus Horn, 1880
 Subtribe Spelaeobatina
 Spelaeobates Muller, 1901
 Graciliella Njunjić, 2016
 Tribe Oritocatopini
 Afrocatops Jeannel, 1964
 Chappuisiotes Jeannel, 1957
 Oritocatops Jeannel, 1921
 Tribe Ptomaphagini Jeannel, 1911
 Subtribe Ptomaphagina Jeannel 1911
 Acrotrychiopsis Normand, 1946
 Adelopsis Portevin, 1907
 Adelopspeleon Salgado, 2012
 Amplexella Gnaspini, 1996
 Parapaulipalpina Gnaspini, 1996
 Paulipalpina Gnaspini & Peck, 1996
 Peckena Gnaspini, 1996
 Ptomaphagus Hellwig, 1795
 Subtribe Ptomaphaginina
 Pandania Szymczakowski, 1964
 Proptomaphaginus Szymczakowski, 1969
 Ptomaphaginus Portevin, 1914
 Ptomaphaminus Perreau, 2000
 Baryodirus Perreau, 2000
 Tribe Sciaphyini
 Sciaphyes Jeannel, 1924
 Subfamily Coloninae Horn, 1880
 Colon Herbst, 1797
 Colonellus Szymczakowski, 1964
 Subfamily Leiodinae Fleming, 1821
 Tribe Agathidiini Westwood, 1838
 Afroagathidium Angelini & Peck, 1984
 Agathidium Panzer, 1797
 Amphicyllis Erichson, 1845
 Anisotoma Panzer, 1797
 Besuchetionella Angelini & Peck, 2000
 Cyrtoplastus Reitter, 1885
 Decuria Miller & Wheeler, 2004
 Gelae Miller & Wheeler, 2005
 Liodopria Reitter, 1909
 Pseudoagathidium Angelini, 1993
 Stetholiodes Fall, 1910
 Tribe Estadiini Portevin, 1914
 Dietta Sharp, 1876
 Tribe Leiodini Fleming, 1821
 Afrocyrtusa Daffner, 1990
 Afroleiodes Peck, 2003
 Anogdus LeConte, 1866
 Chobautiella Reitter, 1900
 Cyrtusa Erichson, 1842
 Cyrtusamorpha Daffner, 1983
 Cyrtusoma Daffner, 1982
 Ecarinosphaerula Hatch, 1929
 Hypoliodes Portevin, 1908
 Incacyrtusa Daffner, 1990
 Isoplastus Horn, 1880
 Leiodes Latreille, 1797
 Liocyrtusa Daffner, 1982
 Lionothus W.J.Brown, 1937
 Ovocyrtusa Daffner, 1985
 Parvocyrtusa Peck & Cook, 2014
 Pseudolionothus Peck & Cook, 2014
 Xanthosphaera Fairmaire, 1859
 Zeadolopus Broun, 1903
 Tribe Pseudoliodini Portevin, 1926
 Agaricophagus Schmidt 1841
 Allocolenisia Daffner, 1990
 Ansibaris Reitter, 1883
 Cainosternum Notman, 1921
 Colenis Erichson, 1842
 Colenisia Fauvel, 1903
 Dermatohomoeus Hlisnikovský, 1963
 Neohydnobius Jeannel, 1962
 Pseudcolenis Reitter, 1884
 Zelodes Leschen, 2000
 †Mesagyrtoides Perkovsky, 1999
 †Tafforeus Perreau, 2012
 Tribe Scotocryptini Reitter, 1884
 Aglyptinus Cockerell, 1906
 Creagrophorus Matthews, 1887
 Cyrtusiola Elisnikovsky, 1974
 Parabystus Portevin, 1907
 Popeus Hlisnikovsky, 1974
 Scotocryptodes Portevin, 1907
 Scotocryptus Girard, 1874
 Synaristus Portevin, 1907
 Termitoglobus Reichensperger, 1915
 Tribe Sogdini Lopatin, 1961
 Anaballetus Newton, Svec & Fikacek
 Euliodes Portevin, 1937
 Hinomoto Hoshina, 2002
 Hydnobius Schmidt, 1841
 Hydnodiaetus Jeannel, 1962
 Isocolon Broun, 1893
 Kalohydnobius Peck & Cook, 2009
 Macrohydnobius Peck & Cook, 2009
 Metahydnobius Portevin, 1942
 Platyhydnobius Peck & Cook, 2009
 Pseudotriarthron Normand, 1938
 Sogda Lopatin, 1961
 Triarthron Märkel, 1840
 Subfamily Platypsyllinae Ritsema, 1869
 Leptinillus Horn, 1882
 Leptinus Müller, 1817
 Platypsyllus Ritsema, 1869
 Silphopsyllus Olsufiev, 1923

References